John Davidson Letcher (died 1938) was an American academic and an acting president of Oregon State University. He served as the acting president for 4 months in 1892, upon the death of the second president Benjamin Lee Arnold.

As a son of Virginia's Confederate governor John Letcher, John Davidson Letcher was born in Virginia and attended Virginia Military Institute, where he obtained a degree in civil engineering. With jobs in the field, he also taught mathematics in several colleges. It was in 1888 that he became a professor at Oregon State University (then "State Agricultural College of the State of Oregon") in Corvallis, Oregon, as the Professor both of Mathematics and Engineering and of Military Science and Tactics.

After OSU's third president Benjamin Lee Arnold suddenly died in January 1892, Letcher was elected unanimously by the Board of Regents as the acting president of the college. His presidency lasted until early June of the year, when John M. Bloss became the third permanent president of OSU. Letcher left the school in 1894 and then served as a mathematics professor of the University of Oregon in Eugene, Oregon until 1896. He returned to Virginia in 1896.

References
https://web.archive.org/web/20080722214922/http://osulibrary.oregonstate.edu/archives/exhibits/presidents/letcher.html

Presidents of Oregon State University
Virginia Military Institute alumni
1938 deaths
People from Virginia
University of Oregon faculty
Year of birth missing